Andrej Stavrov (born April 8, 2001, in Kranj, Slovenia) is a Slovenian professional basketball player for Krka of the Slovenian League. He is a 1.96 m tall guard.

Professional career
Stavrov started playing professional basketball for Triglav Kranj.

In August 2021, Stavrov signed a contract with the Krka.

References

External links
 Eurobasket.com profile
 REALGM profile
 PROBALLERS profile

2001 births
Living people
KK Krka players
Slovenian men's basketball players
Shooting guards
Point guards
ABA League players